Amos Coggswell (September 29, 1825 in Boscawen, New Hampshire – November 15, 1892 in Steele County, Minnesota) was a Minnesota politician, a member of both the Republican and Democratic parties, and a former Speaker of the Minnesota House of Representatives. Coggswell served as a delegate to the Republican State Constitutional Convention in 1857. He was elected to the Minnesota House of Representatives in 1858, and became the second house speaker in 1859.

In 1867, he ran unsuccessfully for Minnesota Secretary of State as a Democrat.  Coggswell was later elected to the Minnesota Senate, where he served the 12th District from 1872 to 1875.

References

 

1825 births
1892 deaths
People from Steele County, Minnesota
Minnesota Republicans
Minnesota Democrats
Minnesota state senators
Members of the Minnesota House of Representatives
Speakers of the Minnesota House of Representatives
19th-century American politicians